Big Ben (previously known as Big Ben Peak, Old Ben Mountain, Emperor William Peak and Kaiser Wilhelm-Berg) is a volcanic massif that dominates the geography of Heard Island in the southern Indian Ocean. Much of it is covered by ice, including 14 major glaciers which descend from Big Ben to the sea. Big Ben is the highest mountain in Australian states and territories, except for those claimed in the Australian Antarctic Territory.

Volcanic activity
Volcanic activity at the cone has been known since 1881. An eruption occurred in 1993. Satellite images detected eruptions during 2000. Satellite images showed hotspots at various times from 2003 to 2008, and during September 2012. A further eruption was reported on 2 February 2016, and was recorded by scientists who happened to be in the area on an expedition. Big Ben does not endanger humans because Heard Island is uninhabited.

Big Ben is in a remote location, and without regular observation it is possible that eruptions have occurred at other times.

See also
List of volcanoes in Australia

References

External links
Click here to see a map of Heard Island and McDonald Islands, including all major topographical features
Location and history of Heard Island
Australian Government (Department of Sustainability, Environment, Water, Population and Communities) Heard Island and MacDonald Islands (HIMI) website

Active volcanoes
Pleistocene stratovolcanoes
Holocene stratovolcanoes
Volcanoes of Heard Island and McDonald Islands